Margaret Croke is a Democratic member of the Illinois House from the 12th district. The 12th district includes parts of the Chicago neighborhoods of Lake View, Lincoln Park, Near North Side, and Uptown.

Croke was elected to the district after defeating then-incumbent Yoni Pizer in the 2020 Democratic primary. Pizer was originally appointed to the seat after the district's long-time representative, Sara Feigenholtz, was tapped to fill former Illinois Senate President John Cullerton's vacancy in the Illinois Senate in the 6th district.

Pizer resigned from the Illinois House of Representatives on December 31, 2020. To fill the remainder of Pizer's term, Croke was sworn into office on January 2, 2021.

As of July 3rd, 2022, Representative Croke is a member of the following Illinois House Committees:

 Appropriations - General Service Committee (HAPG)
 Child Care Accessibility & Early Childhood Education Committee (HCEC)
 (Chairwoman of) Fair Lending and Community Reinvestment Subcommittee (HFIN-FAIR)
 Financial Institutions Committee (HFIN)
 Property Tax Subcommittee (HREF-PRTX)
 Revenue & Finance Committee (HREF)
 Roadways, Rail & Aviation Subcommittee (HTRR-ROAD)
 Small Business, Tech Innovation, and Entrepreneurship Committee (SBTE)
 Transportation: Regulation, Roads & Bridges Committee (HTRR)

Electoral history

References

External links

21st-century American politicians
21st-century American women politicians
Illinois Democrats
Living people
Politicians from Chicago
University of Michigan alumni
Year of birth missing (living people)